This is a list of British political memoirs:

Conservative

Labour

Liberal
Includes Liberals, Liberal Democrats and Social Democrats.

Others

Crossbenchers
 An Accidental MP by Martin Bell (2000)
 Independent Member by A.P. Herbert (1950)
 Time to Declare by David Owen (1992)
 Memoirs by Thomas Bruce, 2nd Earl of Ailesbury (1890)
 Spider Woman: A Life by Brenda Hale, Baroness Hale of Richmond (Penguin Random House, 2021)

UKIP
 Guinea a Minute by Godfrey Bloom (2013)
 Nigel Farage (Biteback)
 Fighting Bull (2010)
 Flying Free (2011)
 The Purple Revolution: The Year That Changed Everything (2015)

SNP
 Stop the World: The Autobiography of Winnie Ewing by Winnie Ewing (2004)
 The Dream Shall Never Die: 100 Days that Changed Scotland Forever by Alex Salmond (HarperCollins, 2015)
 A Difference of Opinion: My Political Journey by Jim Sillars (2021)

Plaid Cymru
 For the Sake of Wales: The Memoirs of Gwynfor Evans by Gwynfor Evans (1996)

Minor Parties
 The Eleventh Hour: A Call for British Rebirth by John Tyndall (1988)
 And Now, Tomorrow by Vernon Bartlett (1960)
 Many Shades of Black: Inside Britain's Far-Right by John Bean (1999)
 The Great White Hope: The Life and Times of Alan ‘Howling Laud’ Hope by Howling Laud Hope (2020)
 Never Give Up!: Standing Tall Through Adversity by Nikki Sinclaire (2013)
 My Life by Oswald Mosley (1968)

 
B